There'll Be Some Changes Made (also released as Empirical) is an album by pianist Jaki Byard recorded in 1972 and released on the Muse label.

Reception
AllMusic awarded the album 4 stars with a review stating, "This is one of his best all-round albums".

Track listing 
All compositions by Jaki Byard except as indicated
 "There'll Be Some Changes Made" (Benton Overstreet, Billy Higgins) - 3:57 
 "Lonely Town" (Leonard Bernstein) - 5:29 
 "Blues au Gratin" - 3:29 
 "Excerpts From Songs of Proverbs / Toni" - 5:17 
 "Bésame Mucho" (Sunny Skylar, Consuelo Velázquez) - 4:54 
 "Spanish Tinge #3" - 2:26 
 "Journey / Night of Departure" - 6:49 
 "To Bob Vatel of Paris / Blues for Jennie" - 5:41 
 "Some Other Spring / Every Year" - 5:54 
 "Tribute to Jimmy Slide" - 4:51

Personnel 
Jaki Byard - piano

References 

Jaki Byard albums
1972 albums
Muse Records albums
Instrumental albums
Solo piano jazz albums